The Rest of Australia cricket team (The Rest) was a domestic first-class cricket team in Australia that played intermittently between 1872/73 and 1939/40.

Background
The Rest most frequently played games against the Australian cricket team, but also played against domestic Australian state sides such as New South Wales and Victoria. The matches between The Rest and Australia were often used to help the national selectors choose teams for forthcoming tours or Test series as the players selected to play for The Rest were players not currently in the Australian XI but whose recent performances had them under consideration for selection.

Matches

References

Australian first-class cricket teams